Scrobifera is a monotypic genus of gastropods belonging to the family Clausiliidae. The only species is Scrobifera taurica.

The species is found in Western Asia.

References

Clausiliidae